Hasania (or Hassania) are members of a Muslim tribe of Arab origin. As of 1911, they were inhabitants of the desert between Merowe and the Nile at the 6th Cataract, and the left bank of the Blue Nile immediately south of Khartoum.

References

Ethnic groups in Sudan
Arabs in Sudan